Alpay Koçaklı (born 19 September 1998) is a Turkish footballer who plays as a right midfielder for Şanlıurfaspor.

Career
Having already featured in three Turkish Cup matches for Karabükspor, Koçaklı made his senior league debut on 29 May 2015, playing the last four minutes in a 4-3 loss to Kayseri Erciyesspor.

International career
Koçaklı has represented Turkey at under-15, under-16, under-17, under-18 and under-19 level.

References

External links

1998 births
People from Zonguldak Province
Living people
Turkish footballers
Turkey youth international footballers
Association football midfielders
Kardemir Karabükspor footballers
Gaziantepspor footballers
Alanyaspor footballers
Adanaspor footballers
Giresunspor footballers
Süper Lig players
TFF First League players
TFF Second League players